Nebria tatrica fatrensis is a subspecies of ground beetle in the Nebriinae subfamily that is endemic to the mountain range of Velká Fatra in Slovakia, and Czech Republic.

References

tatrica fatrensis
Beetles described in 1992
Beetles of Europe
Endemic fauna of Slovakia